Roger Clarke may refer to:
Roger Clarke (martyr) (died 1546), one of the Ipswich Martyrs
Roger Clarke (politician) (1940–2014), 21st-century Jamaican politician
Roger Clarke (rugby union administrator), English rugby union administrator
Roger Geoffrey Clarke (1952–2007), English ornithologist
Roger Clarke (EastEnders), fictional character

See also
 
Roger Clark (actor, born 1908) (1908–1978), American actor
Roger Clark (1939–1998), rally driver
Roger Clark (actor, born 1978), Irish-American actor